Connie Smith is thirty-fourth solo studio album by American country singer Connie Smith. It was released on October 6, 1998 via Warner Bros. Records and contained ten tracks. Nine of the songs were penned by Smith herself, along with artist and performer, Marty Stuart. It was Stuart who also produced the album. The eponymous collection was Smith's first mainstream studio album of new material in 20 years. Smith had returned to recording after raising her children while in semi-retirement. The album received a positive response from critics. No singles were released from the album and instead received promotion elsewhere.

Background
Connie Smith had not recorded a studio album of new material since 1978's New Horizons. She had went into semi-retirement following the ending of Monument contract to raise her three daughters. "I couldn't quit my kids; I couldn't quit my faith, so the only thing I could quit was my country music career," she told biographer Barry Mazor. When Smith's last child left home, she was ready to return to her career completely, which included making a new album. Smith met with Warner/Reprise president, Jim Ed Norman to discuss recording for them. She did several sessions but none of the material satisfied her. It was then suggested that she work with artist and producer, Marty Stuart. Together, the pair would write songs and record the album, ultimately turning into a romantic relationship between the pair. They later married in 1997.

Recording and content
Smith's eponymous album was recorded in Nashville, Tennessee. The sessions were held at the Hounds Ear studio and the Sound Emporium Studio — both located in Nashville, Tennessee. Stuart served as the album's producer, with assistance from Justin Niebank. Allmusic album reviewer, Thom Jurek called the album's sound to be "tough traditional honky tonk music with an edge that makes it very attractive as a rock & roll record."

A total of ten tracks comprised the collection. Nine out of the ten tracks on the album were co-written by Smith and Stuart. One track, "You Can't Back a Teardrop", was written by Tom Shapiro and Chris Waters. The opening track, "How Long", was composed by Stuart, Smith and Harlan Howard. According to Smith, "How Long" was the first song she wrote for the album. Jurek called the opening of "You Can't Back a Teardrop" to resemble that of Ray Price's "Crazy Arms," however he went on to say the rest of the song was different from "Crazy Arms" because, "it's on the far honky tonk edge, with Stuart leading the band in a driving, rollicking shuffle where fiddles drive a pedal steel ever toward the center of the pathos in the center of the bridge."

Smith herself called the album's ninth track, "When It Comes to You" to resemble that of a rock and roll song, stating that she, "yodeled on the end just to be funny, and they kept it in." The ninth track also featured Stuart playing mandolin. The second track, "Lonesome" was also written by Smith and Stuart and was said to resemble, "a bluegrass ghost song about love in the ether," according to Jurek. The closing song on the album, "A Tale from Taharrie" is departure from any of the other tracks on the album, as it resembles a Celtic song, according to Smith, stating, "We wanted to write a song that sounded like the 1700s. It came out sounding Irish. I made up the name "Taharrie" because it fit the sound."

Critical reception

Connie Smith mainly received positive reviews upon its release. Thom Jurek of Allmusic gave the album four out five stars, giving the album's quality much praise, saying, "In all, this is not only a solid effort; it stands head and shoulders over most of the stuff that's come out of Nash Vegas in over a decade. Even if it doesn't sell a copy, it's a triumphant return for Smith. She hasn't lost a whit of her gift as a singer or as a writer." Jurek went on to give it praise, saying, "Connie Smith is a bona fide country and gospel music legend; she is quite literally the only person who deserves to share a reputation with Patsy Cline -- Tammy Wynette and Loretta Lynn notwithstanding." It was also briefly reviewed the book, Country Music: The Rough Guide, which called the effort, "a solid fiddle-and-guitar country that's far gutsier than anything in the Garth-and-Reba mainstream.

Release
The eponymous collection was originally released on October 6, 1998 on Warner Bros. Records. It became the thirty-fifth studio album released in Smith's career and her first with the Warner label. The album was originally distributed as both a compact disc and as a cassette. It was reissued to digital and streaming markets in 2010 via Warner Bros. According to Smith, she was told by country radio that they would not play any songs off the record. Instead, Warner Bros. decided not release any singles off the album to radio. "I don't know if it does her justice to compete in the mainstream," said Warner Bros. senior vice president Bob Saporiti. He added that the album would instead be promoted at National Public Radio and other non-conventional outlets.

Track listing

Personnel
All credits are adapted from the liner notes of Connie Smith and AllMusic.

Musical personnel
 Steve Arnold – bass
 Mark Casstevens – guitar
 Stuart Duncan – fiddle
 Gary Hogue – steel guitar
 Larry Marrs – background vocals, bass
 Michael Rhodes – bass
 Connie Smith – lead vocals
 Gary W. Smith – keyboards
 Stuart Smith – guitar
 Marty Stuart – guitar, mandolin
 Steve Turner – drums
 Biff Watson – guitar
 Cheryl White – background vocals
 Sharon White-Skaggs – background vocals
 Gregg Stocki – drums

Technical personnel
 Holly Gleason – liner notes
 Russ Harrington – photography
 Ken Hutton – assistant engineer
 Glenn Meadows – mastering
 Justin Neibank – engineering, assistant producer
 Garrett Rittenberry – art direction and design
 Marty Stuart – producer

Release history

References

Footnotes

Books

 

1998 albums
Albums produced by Marty Stuart
Connie Smith albums
Warner Records albums